GRX may refer to:

 Federico García Lorca Airport (IATA code), serving Granada, Spain
 Glutaredoxin, a family of enzymes
 GPRS Roaming Exchange
 Guriaso language (ISO 639-3)
 Martin Garrix (born 1996), a Dutch DJ and record producer
 Shimano GRX groupsets, a series of bicycle components designed for gravel riding
 GRX, a fictional engine and racecar in the Speed Racer universe